The 1977 USAC Mini Indy Series season was the first season of the USAC sanctioned Formula Super Vee championship which would later be called Indy Lights. The season contested of four races which was held from the 30 April to the 29 October with all of them being support races for the 1977 USAC Championship Car season.

The season would be won by two drivers, Tom Bagley who won the races in Trenton and Bowmanville. Herm Johnson was the other driver who got on the podium three times including a victory in the final round at Avondale.

Race calendar and results

Teams and drivers

Final standings

References

Indy Lights seasons
1977 in American motorsport